Goodrich House may refer to:

 Goodrich House, Cleveland, Cleveland, Ohio, USA
 Goodrich House Residence Hall, Northwestern University, Illinois, USA
 Heman R. Goodrich House, Hudson in west Lenawee County, Michigan, USA
 Pritchard-Moore-Goodrich House, Griffin, Georgia, USA
 William T. Goodrich House, Davenport, Iowa, USA

See also
 Solomon Goodrich Homestead, historic house in Georgia, Vermont, USA